Alexander Walter Barr Lyle  (born 9 February 1958) is a Scottish professional golfer. Lyle has won two major championships during his career. Along with Nick Faldo and Ian Woosnam, he became one of Britain's top golfers during the 1980s. He spent 167 weeks in the top-10 of the Official World Golf Ranking from its introduction, in 1986, until 1989. Lyle was inducted to the World Golf Hall of Fame in May 2012.

Early life
Lyle was born in Shrewsbury, England and now lives in Scotland with his wife Jolande and children Lonneke and Quintin. He represented Scotland during his professional career. He was introduced to golf by his father, Alex, who had taken the family from Scotland to England in 1955 when he became resident professional at Hawkstone Park golf course. Their family home was just 40 yards from the pro-shop and 18th green. He began playing with miniature clubs at the age of 3. At schoolboy, junior and amateur level Lyle represented England.

Amateur career 
In the summer of 1974, Lyle received a golf scholarship to the University of Houston. However, he did not pass the entrance examination and was not allowed to attend the university. Lyle returned to Britain "to find another route into professional golf."

As an amateur Lyle made his debut in The Open Championship at age 16 in 1974 and won the Brabazon Trophy in 1975 and 1977. He was a member of the Walker Cup team in 1977.

Professional career
In 1977 he turned professional and decided to represent Scotland. He was medalist at the 1977 Qualifying School tournament for the European Tour. His first professional win came in the 1978 Nigerian Open, and he also won the Sir Henry Cotton Award as European Rookie of the Year that season. Lyle attained the first of an eventual 18 European Tour titles in 1979.

Lyle, for Scotland, finished runner-up at the World Cup of Golf team event in 1979, 1980 and 1987; in the latter year Lyle captured the low individual trophy in that event.

Lyle showed his quality by winning The Open Championship at Royal St George's Golf Club in 1985. He was the first British winner since Tony Jacklin in 1969, and continued the rise of European golfers in the world scene.

Lyle was a member of five European Ryder Cup teams, from 1979 to 1987 inclusive. Highlights from those years included the team that was victorious at the Belfry in the autumn of 1985, and the 1987 team which won for the first time ever on American soil, at Muirfield Village.

For many golf fans he is best known for the fairway bunker shot and the subsequent birdie putt at the 18th hole in the final round of the Masters in 1988 when he became the first Briton to wear the green jacket. He also won two other events on the PGA Tour that season, along with the World Match Play Championship, after being a losing finalist on several occasions.

Lyle topped the European Tour's order of merit in 1979, 1980 and 1985. He finished in the top ten nine times between 1979 and 1992. He was also a member of the PGA Tour for several years and finished seventh on the US money list in 1988, despite a limited playing schedule. He won the 1987 Tournament Players Championship, one of the most prestigious American titles. Lyle's form dropped after 1992, when he was 34, and he has not won a significant event since.

Legacy
As a player, Lyle is known for his cool temperament and placid exterior. In his peak years, he was very long from the tee and through the set, and had enough accuracy to master any course. His achievements inspired fellow rivals such as Nick Faldo and Ian Woosnam to raise their games, and go on to win the majors. Lyle published his first book, "To the Fairway Born" in 2006. In the same year he was assistant captain to Ian Woosnam when Europe won the Ryder Cup. He had been hoping to be picked as the captain for the 2010 European Ryder Cup team but missed out to Colin Montgomerie.

In July 2009, Lyle became involved in a public row with Colin Montgomerie where he unfavourably compared Montgomerie's actions at the Indonesian Open four years previously with his own actions in not completing a round at the 2008 Open Championship. Reaction to this was mixed with some players supporting Lyle while other players and commentators felt that Lyle's timing was unfortunate and that any point he may have had was lost in the ensuing controversy.

Senior career
On turning 50 in 2008, Lyle played on the Champions Tour and the European Senior Tour.

Lyle won his first tournament in 19 years when he captured his first European Senior Tour title at the 2011 ISPS Handa Senior World Championship, held in China.

He took up hickory golf, winning the World Hickory Open in his native Scotland in 2014 and 2016. Lyle referred to the 2016 victory as his "fourth major" to go along with the 2014 crown, as well as the 1988 Masters and 1985 Open titles.

Amateur wins
1975 Brabazon Trophy, Carris Trophy
1977 Brabazon Trophy, Berkshire Trophy, British Youths Open Amateur Championship

Professional wins (30)

PGA Tour wins (6)

PGA Tour playoff record (3–1)

European Tour wins (18)

European Tour playoff record (3–3)

Japan Golf Tour wins (1)

Japan Golf Tour playoff record (1–0)

Safari Circuit wins (1)

Other wins (5)

Other playoff record (1–0)

European Senior Tour wins (1)

Major championships

Wins (2)

Results timeline
Results not in chronological order in 2020.

CUT = missed the half way cut (3rd round cut in 1974 and 1983 Open Championships)
WD = withdrew
"T" indicates a tie for a place
NT = No tournament due to COVID-19 pandemic

Summary

Most consecutive cuts made – 12 (1984 Open Championship – 1988 Open Championship)
Longest streak of top-10s – 1 (four times)

The Players Championship

Wins (1)

Results timeline

CUT = missed the halfway cut
"T" indicates a tie for a place

Results in senior major championships
Results not in chronological order before 2021.

CUT = missed the halfway cut
"T" indicates a tie for a place
NT = No tournament due to COVID-19 pandemic

Team appearances
Amateur
Walker Cup (representing Great Britain and Ireland): 1977
Commonwealth Tournament (representing Great Britain): 1975
St Andrews Trophy (representing Great Britain & Ireland): 1976 (winners)
European Amateur Team Championship (representing England): 1977

Professional
Ryder Cup (representing Europe): 1979, 1981, 1983, 1985 (winners), 1987 (winners)
World Cup (representing Scotland): 1979, 1980 (individual winner), 1987
Hennessy Cognac Cup (representing Great Britain and Ireland): 1980 (winners), 1982 (winners), (representing Scotland) 1984 (individual winner)
Dunhill Cup (representing Scotland): 1985, 1986, 1987, 1988, 1989, 1990, 1992
Nissan Cup/Kirin Cup (representing Europe): 1985 (individual winner), 1986, 1987
UBS Cup (representing the Rest of the World): 2004

See also
List of golfers with most European Tour wins

References

External links

Scottish male golfers
European Tour golfers
PGA Tour golfers
European Senior Tour golfers
PGA Tour Champions golfers
Ryder Cup competitors for Europe
Winners of men's major golf championships
World Golf Hall of Fame inductees
Members of the Order of the British Empire
People educated at Thomas Adams School
Anglo-Scots
Sportspeople from Shrewsbury
1958 births
Living people